Rewind Best (stylized as rewind BEST) is a series of two greatest hits albums by the Japanese electronica band Capsule, simultaneously released on March 6, 2013. The releases contain fifteen songs each. The first album, Rewind Best-1 (2012→2006), spans music from their seventh album Fruits Clipper (2006) to their thirteenth album Stereo Worxxx (2012). The second album, Rewind Best-2 (2005→2001), contains music from Capsule's first album High Collar Girl (2001) to their sixth, L.D.K. Lounge Designers Killer (2005).

Rewind Best-1 (2012→2006) debuted at number twenty-two on the Oricon Albums Chart while Rewind Best-2 (2005→2001) debuted at number twenty-seven. Both albums fell out of the top fifty in their second week, and were on the chart for a total of five weeks. 

These albums were the duo's last releases with Contemode and its parent company Yamaha Music Communications following their transfer to Warner Music Japan.

Track listing

Charts

Rewind Best-1

Rewind Best-2

References

Capsule (band) compilation albums
2013 greatest hits albums
Albums produced by Yasutaka Nakata